Choral Arts is an American choir, based in Seattle, Washington, performing under the direction of conductor and artistic director Robert Bode.  Choral Arts comprises volunteer singers drawn exclusively from the Seattle region who combine a deep sense of community with a degree of artistic excellence that has garnered national recognition and critical acclaim.

Composer in Residence
Each year, Choral Arts chooses a Composer-in-residence to help direct the artistic choices of the choir throughout the season.  The composer also composes a new piece for the choir in the spring, putting to words the poetry of the choir's "Finding Your Voice" competition, which invites students between 6th-12th grade to submit poetry to be set to choral music.  Following is a list of recent Composers in residence:
 2009 - 2010 - Vijay Singh
 2010 - 2011 - Giselle Wyers
 2011 - 2012 - Karen P. Thomas
 2012 - 2013 - Eric Barnum
 2013 - 2014 - John David Earnest
 2014 - 2015 - Melinda Bargreen
 2015 - 2016 - Jake Runestad

Awards
 2010 - Margaret Hillis Achievement Award for Choral Excellence
 2010 - Awarded performance slot at the ACDA Regional Conference
 2010 - The American Prize for choral performance (1st Place)
 2013 - Awarded performance slot at the Chorus America National Conference
 2013 - The American Prize for choral performance (2nd Place)
 2015 - Awarded performance slot at the ACDA National Conference in Salt Lake City, Utah

Premieres
 Vergine bella, John David Earnest, 2013
 Behold the Handmaid, Rick Asher, 2013
 Psallite, Rick Asher, 2013
 Returning, John David Earnest, 2014
 Night, Melinda Bargreen, 2015
 Making Peace, John Muehleisen, 2015

Discography

CDs 
 The Light of Stars (1993)
 A Scandinavian Christmas (1997)
 Cathedral Anthems (2002)
 Mornings Like This (2009)
 Frank Ferko Stabat Mater (2010)
 Shall We Gather at the River (2012)
 Life Stories: The Choral Music of Eric Barnum (2014)

References

External links
Choral Arts - Official Site

Choirs in Washington (state)
Musical groups from Seattle
Musical groups established in 1992